Petar Ratkov (born 18 August 2003) is a Serbian professional footballer who plays as a centre-forward for TSC Bačka Topola.

Style of play
Issue number 375 of the CIES Football Observatory puts Ratkov in the 79th place of 100 best performing U21 outfield players from 32 European leagues according to players’ performance compared to teammates, the employer team’s sporting level, as well as that of opponents, covering eight different game areas: air defence, ground defence, recovery, distribution, take on, chance creation, air attack and shooting. Ratkov is the third-youngest player on the list at the age of 18.6, the only Serbian player on the list, and his game profile is characterized as a target man shooter.

References

External links
 
 
 

2003 births
Footballers from Belgrade
Living people
Serbian footballers
Serbia youth international footballers
Association football forwards
FK TSC Bačka Topola players
Serbian SuperLiga players
Serbia under-21 international footballers